Atagema rugosa, the rugby-ball dorid, is a species of dorid nudibranch, a marine gastropod mollusc in the family Discodorididae.

Distribution
This species was described from Cap l'Abeille, near Banyuls-sur-Mer, France. It has been reported from the bay of Gallipoli, Italy, in the Mediterranean Sea and around the southern African coast on the Atlantic side of the Cape Peninsula in 10–15 m of water. It is probable that the species known by this name in South Africa is actually a distinct species.

Description
Atagema rugosa is described as a beige animal, darker in the lower parts of the mantle. Its tubercles are arranged in crests forming a network. It has five gills, with the three posterior held almost horizontal and the two anterior very small. The South African rugby-ball dorid is a small white nudibranch with black spots, a warty skin and a distinct longitudinal ridge down the middle of its back. It has eight gills arranged around the anus and its rhinophores are perfoliate. It can reach a total length of 30 mm.

Ecology
The rugby-ball dorid feeds on sponges.

References

Discodorididae
Gastropods described in 1951
Taxa named by Alice Pruvot-Fol